Spanish Wells is a district of the Bahamas. According to the 2010 census, it has a population of 1,551 residents.

Overview
Spanish Wells is so small that many residents get around the island using golf carts instead of full-sized cars. Spanish Wells is known for its white powdery beaches, tropical breezes, laid back atmospheres and friendly people.

History
Historically, the island was used as a last stop for Spanish ships returning to Europe, where these ships refilled their water supply from wells created for this purpose - thus the English name of the settlement: Spanish Wells. The first British colonists were the Eleutheran adventurers from Bermuda (intending to be some of the first settlers of Eleuthera), who suffered shipwreck on a reef, known as the "Devil's Backbone" off Eleuthera in 1647.  After living in a cave known as "Preacher's Cave" on Eleuthera, they ended up at Spanish Wells.  Among other, later, groups of settlers were Crown loyalists, who left the United States after the American Revolutionary War.

The area suffered extensive property damage during a direct hit from Hurricane Andrew in 1992 and Floyd in 1999.

Economy
Currently, (2006) Spanish Wells is a centre for lobster fishing and tourism  in the Bahamas. In the late 1970s and early 1980s, Spanish Wells served as a transhipment point for illicit recreational drugs being shipped from South America to North America.

Demographics
Spanish Wells is populated primarily by White Bahamians, who constitute 81.95% of the district's population. Afro-Bahamians constitute a further 15.48% of the population. As of the 2010 census, the district is home to 1,551 residents.

Notable people 

 Clay Sweeting, Member of Parliament and Cabinet Minister

References

 Everild Young, Eleuthera the island called Freedom, Regency Press (London, 1969)

Districts of the Bahamas
Eleuthera
1647 establishments in the British Empire